Northern Midlands Council is a local government body in Tasmania, extending south of Launceston into the northern region of the Tasmanian central midlands. Northern Midlands is classified as a rural local government area and has a population of 13,300, the major population centres and localities of the region include Campbell Town, Evandale, Longford, and Perth.

History and attributes
On 2 April 1993, the municipalities of Campbell Town, Evandale, Fingal, Longford and Ross were amalgamated to form the Northern Midlands Council. Northern Midlands is classified as rural, agricultural and very large under the Australian Classification of Local Governments.

Localities

Not in above list
 Ben Lomond
 Bracknell
 Interlaken
 Lake Sorell
 Lemont
 Liffey
 Relbia
 Travellers Rest
 White Hills
 Youngtown

See also
List of local government areas of Tasmania

References

External links

Northern Midlands Council official website
Local Government Association Tasmania
Tasmanian Electoral Commission - local government

 
Local government areas of Tasmania